Jürgen Schmid (born 11 February 1982 in Parsberg) is a retired German footballer.

References

External links 
 
 

1982 births
Living people
People from Neumarkt (district)
Sportspeople from the Upper Palatinate
German footballers
Germany youth international footballers
Association football forwards
3. Liga players
FC Bayern Munich II players
SSV Jahn Regensburg players
SV Sandhausen players
Footballers from Bavaria